Shooting Star Live is a live album by the group Shooting Star.

Track listing

Personnel
Van McLain – guitars, lead vocals
Keith Mitchell – lead vocals
Dennis Laffoon – keyboards, vocals
Rod Lincoln – drums
Ron Verlin – bass

References

1990 live albums
Shooting Star (band) albums